The list of ship decommissionings in 1954 includes a chronological list of all ships decommissioned in 1954.


See also 

1954
 Ship decommissionings
Ship